Bosque Brewing Company is a microbrewery based in New Mexico with taprooms in Albuquerque and Las Cruces. The company produces beers inspired by American and European style traditions that are distributed throughout the state of New Mexico.

History

Co-Founders Gabe Jensen, Jotham Michnovicz, and Kevin Jameson began Bosque Brewing Company with the intent of designing and producing high-quality, flavorful beers while creating jobs and contributing to the local economy and community. The partners started their initial recipe development in 2010 with full-scale brewing operations beginning in 2012, and then opening for business in October 2012 at the original taproom located on San Mateo Boulevard in Albuquerque. They crafted 6 original house styles as year-round offerings with a select few rotating specialty beers.

After celebrating the company's first anniversary, Bosque moved into an aggressive growth phase that included multiple expansions in facilities, staff, and equipment. John Bullard joined Bosque Brewing in March 2014 as Brewmaster and Director of Brewing Operations. As an award-winning head brewer prior to joining the company, Bullard refined recipes and significantly expanded the company's standard and specialty offerings. The company's second location opened in November 2014 across from New Mexico State University in Las Cruces. One month later the third location opened on the border of the Nob Hill Business District and the University of New Mexico area in Albuquerque. Finally, distribution quickly expanded into more than 150 restaurants and retail outlets across the state of New Mexico.

Awards
Great American Beer Festival

Great American Beer Festival
Awards from the Great American Beer Festival:
 2014: Acequia Wet Hop IPA, Bronze Medal Winner, Fresh or Wet Hop Ale
 2015: Acequia Wet Hop IPA, Gold Medal Winner, Fresh or Wet Hop Ale

Brewing News IPA Championship
 2015: Scale Tipper IPA, NIPAC Champion
 2016: Scale Tipper IPA, NIPAC Champion

New Mexico Brewers Guild’s IPA Challenge
 2015: Scale Tipper IPA, NMIPAC Winner
 2014: Scale Tipper IPA, NMIPAC Winner

Products
Bosque Brewing Company maintains six year-round offerings and six rotating specialty beers at all times. The beers produced by Bosque honor time-tested traditions while experimenting with and pioneering new techniques and recipes. Bosque's beers are available on draft at each taproom and at restaurants and bars throughout New Mexico. Limited runs of bottled specialty beers are available at each taproom and at select retailers throughout the state.

See also
List of breweries in New Mexico

External links
 Official Website

References

Beer brewing companies based in New Mexico
Manufacturing companies based in Albuquerque, New Mexico
Brewery buildings in the United States
Buildings and structures in Albuquerque, New Mexico
Drinking establishments in New Mexico
Las Cruces, New Mexico
American companies established in 2012
Food and drink companies established in 2012
2012 establishments in New Mexico
Tourist attractions in Albuquerque, New Mexico